Ziarat-e Hasanabad (also Romanized as Zīārat-e Ḩasanābād; also known as Ḩasanābād-e Zīārat, Zeyārat, Zeyāreh, Zīārat, Zīārat-e Kīlā, Zīārat Kalleh, Ziyārat Kalla, and Ziyārat Kalleh) is a village in Sirik Rural District, Byaban District, Minab County, Hormozgan Province, Iran. At the 2006 census, its population was 229, in 34 families.

References 

Populated places in Minab County